Doing Things Media (DTM) is a company that focuses on pop culture and humor. Its brands include Middle Class Fancy, Animals Doing Things, Shitheadsteve, Recess Therapy, Bob Does Sports, and Overheard.

It was founded in 2017 and was headquartered in Atlanta before opting for permanent remote work.  As of 2022, the company has 25 social media meme accounts with over 65 million followers across Instagram and other platforms.

History 
Doing Things Media was founded by Reid Hailey and Derek Lucas in 2017 after both had developed large followings for posting internet memes on Instagram. Reid Hailey created an Instagram meme account named @Shitheadsteve in 2014, while taking college classes at the University of Alabama. The account obtained one million followers in less than a year, and Hailey created other accounts such as @Trashcanpaul and @Gamersdoingthings. Hailey met his future co-founder Derek Lucas after Lucas created the meme account @ChampagneEmojis is 2015. Both Reid Hailey and Derek Lucas dropped out of college. Lucas starting a medical-marijuana delivery service before co-founding Doing Things Media.

Hailey and Lucas were part of a group message that called itself the Meme Illuminati. The chat included meme accounts and celebrities including Chris D'Elia, John Mayer, and B.J. Novak.

In 2022, Doing Things secured a $21.5 million Series A funding round.

Work 
Paper Magazine writes that "the overall theme of what makes it onto any of their meme pages seems to be 'nostalgic wholesomeness' — humor that somehow doesn't offend anyone because the stereotypes they joke about are so deeply benign." DTM describes itself as a "24/7 dopamine drip machine.” Because it produces dozens of popular social media accounts, DTM is able to cross-promote new projects.

As of 2020, 30% of the company's revenue comes from e-commerce. In addition, Doing Things Media makes money from subscription content and TV production and sponsored ads that resemble memes. 

Doing Things Media had a TV show on Nat Geo Wild called "Animals Doing Things" based on its @AnimalsDoingThings account. Howie Mandel is its narrator, executive producer, and director. The company wrote a book called Doggos Doing Things based on its @DoggosDoingThings account. “We are always thinking about how to turn our social presence into a product," co-founder Reid Hailey told The Hustle. "Can we make a game? Can we make a beverage?”

Middle Class Fancy 
Doing Things Media acquired the brand MiddleClassFancy in 2018. In 2021, MiddleClassFancy teamed up with Guy Fieri to release a limited-edition burger at Fieri's ghost kitchen called Guy Fieri's Flavortown Kitchen.

All Gas No Brakes 
In 2019, Andrew Callaghan became a full-time content creator for Doing Things Media after the company's co-founder Reid Hailey saw one of Callaghan's videos. Doing Things also hired Callaghan's longtime friends, Nic Mosher and Evan Gilbert-Katz. All Gas No Brakes got traction on YouTube in late 2019 and throughout 2020. In May 2020, the company signed a development deal with Abso Lutely Productions for a TV series based on All Gas No Brakes. The relationship eventually soured between Callaghan and Doing Things Media, with the company encouraging him to focus on “party content” rather than news and, at one point, locking him out of the All Gas No Brakes social media accounts. Doing Things threatened to fire the three-person All Gas No Brakes team if they did not create two pieces of Patreon content by March 1, 2021. They refused, and Callaghan refused to hand over the show to a new host. They were fired in March 2021.

Recess Therapy 
In 2020, Julian Shapiro-Barnum began a video series in which he interviews children, originally titled as Kids Doing Things. Doing Things Media hired Shapiro-Barnum, rebranded the account, and launched it as Recess Therapy. The host was inspired how “kids in the playground remained joyous despite the pandemic’s perturbations.” In an interview with The New York Times, Shapiro-Barnum said, “The reason it’s called Recess Therapy is that the original idea was that I was going to bring things that I was struggling with to children and, like, get advice from them.”

Since its launch, Recess Therapy has over 2.4 million followers. In 2022, the series produced the viral video Corn Kid, which was named #1 TikTok trend of 2022.

Overheard 
In January 2023, Doing Things Media acquired Overheard, a social media brand dedicated to sharing eavesdropped conversations in locales like Los Angeles and New York.

Bob Does Sports
In 2021, Doing Things Media partnered with Robby Berger to create Bob Does Sports, an online series which focuses on golf content. Co-hosted by Fat Perez and Joe Demare, the account has over 330,000 Instagram followers.

Controversy 
Doing Things Media faced criticism for posting sponsored content about Mike Bloomberg's presidential campaign across twelve of the company’s pages. According to Reuters, Doing Things Media founder Reid Hailey said it was "a creative decision, rather than an endorsement of Bloomberg." Other meme accounts, such as those affiliated with FuckJerry, also promoted Bloomberg.

References 

Instagram accounts
Internet-related controversies
Internet-based works
Memes
Social media companies of the United States